Marlon Williams is the solo debut self-titled studio album by New Zealand musician Marlon Williams. It was released in 2015 under Caroline Australia.

Track listing
All tracks composed by Marlon Williams; except where noted.

Personnel
Marlon Williams - vocals, acoustic guitar, electric guitar on "After All" and "I'm Lost Without You", synthesizer on "I'm Lost Without You"
Ben Woolley - bass guitar, backing vocals
AJ Park - drums
Aldous Harding - backing vocals on "Hello Miss Lonesome", "Lonely Side of Her", "Silent Passage", "Strange Things" and "Everyone's Got Something to Say"
Aaron Tokona - acoustic and electric guitar on Hello Miss Lonesome"
Joe McCallum - drums on "Silent Passage"
Rang Lloyd - electric guitar on "Dark Child"
Simon Gregory - electric guitar on "I'm Lost Without You"
John Egenes - pedal steel on "Silent Passage"
Ben Edwards - synthesizer on "Dark Child" and "Strange Things"
Anita Clark - violin on "Strange Things"
Mikey Somerfield - violin on "I'm Lost Without You" and "Silent Passage"
Ben Brown - backing vocals on "Everyone Got Something to Say"
David Williams - backing vocals on "After All"

Charts

References

2015 albums
Dead Oceans albums
Marlon Williams (New Zealand musician) albums